Allie Kiick was the defending champion, but chose not to participate.

Taylor Townsend won the title, defeating Grace Min in an all-American final, 7–5, 6–1.

Seeds

Main draw

Finals

Top half

Bottom half

References 
 Main draw

Boyd Tinsley Women's Clay Court Classic - Singles